Elizabeth Austin may refer to:
Elizabeth Austin (writer) (born 1958), American writer
Elizabeth Austin (soprano) (1800–?), English opera singer and actress
Elizabeth R. Austin (born 1938), American organist and composer
Elizabeth Austin (Australian pioneer) (1821–1910), Australian pioneer and philanthropist
Elizabeth Jean Austin (born 1964), CEO and founder of WeatherExtreme Ltd.
Beth Austin, a character in This Woman Is Dangerous